Batman Yeni Şehir Stadyumu is a stadium in Batman, Turkey. It opened in 2018 and has a capacity of 15,000 spectators.  It is the new home of Batman Petrolspor and replaced the club's old home, the 16 Mayıs Stadium.

References

Football venues in Turkey
Sports venues completed in 2018
Buildings and structures in Turkey
Sport in Batman, Turkey
2018 establishments in Turkey